Prospector may refer to:

Space exploration
 Prospector (spacecraft), a planned lunar probe, canceled in 1962
 Lunar Prospector, a NASA spacecraft

Trains
 Prospector (train), a passenger train operated by the Denver & Rio Grande Western railroad
 The Prospector (train), a service in Western Australia

Other uses
 Prospector (library catalog), a unified catalog for Colorado and Wyoming
 Prospecting, exploring an area for natural resources such as minerals, oil, flora or fauna
 Prospectors (TV series), a weekly reality television series that premiered in 2013 on The Weather Channel
 The Prospector, a statue outside the Sitka Pioneer Home in Sitka, Alaska, United States
 Le Chercheur d'or, a French novel by French J. M. G. Le Clézio and translated into English as The prospector by Carol Marks
 "The Prospector", nickname of American archer Brady Ellison
 The Prospector, student newspaper at the University of Texas at El Paso